This is a list of electoral districts for local council elections in Taiwan.

List

References 

Constituencies in Taiwan